Juhani Tamminen (born January 11, 1989) is a Finnish ice hockey player who plays as a centre for Ilves.

References

External links

1989 births
Living people
HIFK (ice hockey) players
Ilves players
Finnish ice hockey centres
Rovaniemen Kiekko players
People from Hämeenlinna
Sportspeople from Kanta-Häme